The 1967 Whitewater State Warhawks football team was an American football team that represented Wisconsin State University—Whitewater—now known as the University of Wisconsin–Whitewater—as a member of the Wisconsin State University Conference (WSUC) during the 1967 NAIA football season. In their 12th season under head coach Forrest Perkins, the Warhawks began the year as the favorite to win the WSUC championship. They compiled an 8–1 record and won the WSUC championship. The team set WSUC records for fewest points allowed (72 points in eight conference games), fewest rushing yards (379), and fewest total yards (1,184).

Six Whitewater players received first-team honors on the WSUC all conference team: halfback Greg Jones; offensive guard Jim Perkins; defensive end Jerry Mahoney; defensive tackle Larry Dickerson; linebacker Al Equi; and defensive halfback Neil Hansen. End Barry Wojtak and cornerback Jim Olmstead were selected as the team's most valuable seniors.

Schedule

References

Whitewater State
Wisconsin–Whitewater Warhawks football seasons
Whitewater State Warhawks football